The South African Railways Class DS of 1939 was a diesel-electric locomotive.

The first diesel-electric locomotive on the South African Railways was a single Class DS AEG diesel-electric shunting locomotive which was placed in service at the Congella yards near Durban in 1939.

Diesel-steam comparison
Around 1935, the question of purchasing diesel locomotives for the South African Railways (SAR) was seriously considered. Even though South Africa was a coal-rich country with, at the time, the lowest pit-head prices in the world and no oil wells, there were definite advantages in favour of the diesel-electric locomotive. It did not need to take water en route, could undertake very long runs without the need to refuel or change locomotives and had a much higher rate of availability.

The first costs were much in favour of steam locomotives, for which it decreased in cost per unit of power as the size increased, an advantage that the diesel-electric did not seem to have.

Manufacturer
As a result of the problems experienced to obtain adequate water supplies of good quality in the arid regions of South Africa and South West Africa, particularly on the section from De Aar via Upington to Keetmanshoop, the SAR decided to experiment with diesel-powered traction and introduced its first two diesel-electric shunting locomotives in 1939.

The first of these was a single twin-engined centre-cab locomotive with a  wheel arrangement which was ordered from Allgemeine Elektricitäts-Gesellschaft (AEG) in Berlin for use as a shunting engine. The locomotive was designated Class DS and was initially numbered D137, but it was soon renumbered to D513. Both numbers were in the electric locomotive number range, but with a "D" for diesel instead of an "E" for electric number prefix.

Characteristics
The  locomotive was powered by two Maschinenfabrik Augsburg-Nürnberg (MAN)  eight-cylinder diesel engine prime movers, one on either side of the cab. An AEG  main generator and an AEG  auxiliary generator were mounted directly in line between each engine and the cab. Each engine was water-cooled with a fan which was belt-driven by its engine and which drew air through a conventional radiator.

The bogies were very similar to those of the Class 1E electric locomotive, each with two DC traction motors arranged in series. Each bogie axle was driven by a force-ventitated axle-suspended DC traction motor, with the two motors on each bogie electrically arranged in series. The cab was equipped with mechanically interlocked dual controls to enable operation in either direction.

Service
The locomotive was placed in service at the Congella yards near Durban. Even though performance-wise the results were rather disappointing, it nevertheless remained in service for 28 years.

The first diesel-electric locomotive on the SAR eventually found its way to Cape Town where it was scrapped at the Salt River Works in November 1966.

Illustration

References

External links

AEG locomotives
Bo-Bo locomotives
Cape gauge railway locomotives
3270
3270
Railway locomotives introduced in 1939
1939 in South Africa